The New Hampshire Wildcats women’s ice hockey team represents the University of New Hampshire. The Wildcats won the 2008 Hockey East championship and participated in the NCAA Frozen Four.

Regular season
Freshman Jennifer Wakefield finished second in New Hampshire scoring, but led all New Hampshire freshmen in scoring.
During the 2007-08 season, Sam Faber of New Hampshire set an NCAA record (since tied) for most game winning goals in one season with 13.

Player stats

Awards and honors
Jennifer Wakefield, Hockey East Rookie of the Year 
Jennifer Wakefield, Hockey East First All-Star Team
Jennifer Wakefield, Hockey East All-Tournament Team 
Jennifer Wakefield, Hockey East All-Academic Team

Postseason
New Hampshire lost in the NCAA semifinals to Minnesota-Duluth.

References

External links
Official site

New Hampshire Wildcats women's ice hockey seasons
New Hampshire
NCAA women's ice hockey Frozen Four seasons
New Ham
New Ham